The 2020 Rafael Nadal tennis season officially began on 3 January 2020, in the first round at the inaugural 2020 ATP Cup Group B venues in Perth.

Yearly summary

Early hard court season

ATP Cup
Nadal started his season at the inaugural ATP Cup as part of the Spanish squad. Nadal will be playing in singles along with compatriot Roberto Bautista Agut, while the doubles team will consist of Feliciano López and Pablo Carreño Busta. Spain was placed in Group B and will play their round-robin matches against Japan, Uruguay, and Georgia in Perth.

In Nadal's round-robin singles matches, he defeated Nikoloz Basilashvili, Pablo Cuevas and Yoshihito Nishioka in straight sets. Nadal also played in the doubles match against Japan, along with Carreño Busta, and won the match in three sets. The Spanish team then moved on to Sydney to play in the QF. In the singles in QF, Nadal faced David Goffin, to whom he lost the match in straight sets. However, because compatriot Bautista Agut won his singles match, and Nadal and Carreño Busta won in the doubles, Spain moved on to the SF against Australia. There, Nadal defeated Alex de Minaur in the singles in 3 sets, and combined with Bautista Agut's defeat of Nick Kyrgios in straight sets earlier, moved Spain to the ATP Cup Final. In the final, they played against Serbia, with Nadal's singles match against World No. 2 Novak Djokovic. Nadal lost the match in straight sets to Djokovic, and with Spain's loss in doubles, Team Serbia won the ATP Cup.

Australian Open

Nadal's second tournament of the season will be the 2020 Australian Open. He won his first two matches against Hugo Dellien and Federico Delbonis in straight sets. He defeated compatriot and the 27th seed Pablo Carreño Busta in the 3rd round, again in straight sets. He defeated Nick Kyrgios in 4 sets the 4th round.  However, he lost to World No. 5 Dominic Thiem in 4 sets at the QF.

Mexican Open
Nadal's first tournament following the Australian Open was the Mexican Open. He defeated Pablo Andujar, Miomir Kecmanović, and Kwon Soon-woo, all in straight sets to set up a semi-final encounter with Grigor Dimitrov. He was able to defeat Dimitrov easily in straight sets to reach his first final in Acapulco since 2017, and his first final for the 2020 season. He defeated Taylor Fritz in the final in straight sets, to win his third title in Acapulco and his first title in 2020.

Season hiatus
On March 8, due to the COVID-19 pandemic, the season went on indefinite hiatus. The following measures were taken:

 The ATP and WTA announced the suspension of their 2020 tournaments until July 13. On March 18, the ATP froze their player rankings.
 On March 17, the French Tennis Federation announced the decision of postponing the French Open, to be held now from September 20 to October 4, 2020.
 On March 24, after talks between Japan's prime minister and the International Olympic Committee president, the 2020 Summer Olympics were officially postponed to 2021. On March 30, the various organising entities reached an agreement to hold the Olympics between July 23 and August 8, 2021.
 On April 1, the All England Club announced the decision of cancelling Wimbledon, opting to focus on the 2021 edition of the tournament.

Clay Court Season

Nadal opted to skip the Western and Southern Open and the US Open to prepare for the clay court season.

Italian Open
Nadal's first match back was against fellow Spaniard Pablo Carreno Busta, which he won 6–1, 6–1. In the next round, he played Serb Dušan Lajović, whom he defeated 6–1, 6–3. In the QF, he lost to Diego Schwartzman 2–6, 5–7.

French Open

Nadal won his 13th Roland Garros title, beating Novak Djokovic in straight sets in the tournament's final, only losing seven games. In doing so, he won his 20th Grand Slam title, equalling Roger Federer's record as the man with the most number of Grand Slam titles. It also marked his 100th win at the tournament, losing only twice in 16 years.  His straight-sets victory over Djokovic marked also the 4th time that he won a Grand Slam without losing a set, all at the French Open doing it also in 2008, 2010 and 2017. Nadal also became the first player to defeat Djokovic in a completed match all year, Djokovic being 37-1 on the season prior to the loss to Nadal, with his only loss being the us open default.

European indoor hard court season

Paris Masters
Nadal lost to Alexander Zverev in the semifinals.

Nitto ATP Finals

Nadal defeated Andrey Rublev in his first round robin match.  Two days later he lost to Dominic Thiem in two incredibly tight sets.  He qualified for the semifinals with a three set win over Stefanos Tsitsipas.  In the semis he faced Daniil Medvedev, and despite serving for a straight sets win, he lost in three sets, ending his bid to win his first ever title at the season ending event.

All matches
This table chronicles all the matches of Rafael Nadal in 2020.

Singles matches

Doubles matches

Exhibition matches

Singles

Doubles

Schedule
Per Rafael Nadal, the below was his 2020 schedule.

Singles schedule

Doubles schedule

Yearly records

Head-to-head matchups
Rafael Nadal has a  ATP match win–loss record in the 2020 season. Bold indicates player was ranked top 10 at the time of at least one meeting. The following list is ordered by number of wins:

  Pablo Carreño Busta 3–0
  Pablo Andújar 1–0
  Nikoloz Basilashvili 1–0
  Pablo Cuevas 1–0
  Federico Delbonis 1–0
  Hugo Dellien 1–0
  Grigor Dimitrov 1–0
  Taylor Fritz 1–0
  Egor Gerasimov 1–0
  Miomir Kecmanović 1–0
  Sebastian Korda 1–0 
  Nick Kyrgios 1–0
  Dušan Lajović 1–0
  Feliciano López 1–0
  Mackenzie McDonald 1–0
  Alex de Minaur 1–0
  Yoshihito Nishioka 1–0
  Andrey Rublev 1–0
  Jannik Sinner 1–0
  Kwon Soon-woo 1–0
  Jordan Thompson 1–0
  Stefano Travaglia 1–0
  Stefanos Tsitsipas 1–0 
  Novak Djokovic 1–1
  Diego Schwartzman 1–1
  David Goffin 0–1
  Alexander Zverev 0–1
  Dominic Thiem 0–2

* Statistics correct .

Finals

Singles: 2 (2 titles)

Team competitions: (1 final)

Earnings
Bold font denotes tournament win

 Figures in United States dollars (USD) unless noted. 
source：2020 Singles Activity
source：2020 Doubles Activity

Television

At the ATP Cup, Nadal's semifinals match versus Alex de Minaur averaged 320,000 viewers on Teledeporte, and his final match versus Novak Djokovic averaged 953,000 viewers on RTVE's La 1.

At the French Open, his semifinals match versus Diego Schwartzman averaged 403,000 viewers on DMAX and 232,000 viewers on Eurosport. His final match versus Djokovic averaged 1.5 million viewers on DMAX and 628,000 on Eurosport, combining for a 16.8% share.

At the ATP Finals, his semifinals match versus Daniil Medvedev  averaged 274,000 vewiers on #Vamos.

See also
 2020 ATP Tour
 2020 Novak Djokovic tennis season
 2020 Dominic Thiem tennis season

Notes

References

External links 
 
ATP tour profile

Rafael Nadal tennis seasons
Nadal
2020 in Spanish tennis
2020 in Spanish sport